Logos is an important term in philosophy, analytical psychology, rhetoric, and religion.

Logos may also refer to:
 Plural of logo

Logos in religion

Christianity
 Logos (Christianity), name or title of Jesus Christ
 Logos Bible Software, a software application
 Logos Radio, a Christian radio channel in Cyprus
 Logos: A Journal of Catholic Thought and Culture, an academic journal
 MV Logos II, a 1968 ship used in evangelical missions of Operation Mobilisation
 Logos School, a Christian school in Moscow, Idaho

Islam
 Logos (Islam)

Music
 Logos Live, a 1982 album by Tangerine Dream
 Logos (Atlas Sound album), 2009
 Logos (Selfish Things album), 2019

In fiction
 A [[List of Final Fantasy X-2 characters#Leblanc Syndicate|character in Final Fantasy X-2]]
 A language in Tabula Rasa
 One of the three Trinity Core Processors known as the Aegises in Xenoblade Chronicles 2

Other uses
 58534 Logos, a Kuiper belt object
 An informative hallucinatory voice Terence McKenna, believed was universal to visionary religious experience
 Logos Dictionary, an online dictionary provided by Logos Group
 Logos Foundation, an organisation for the promotion of new musics and audio
 Logos (journal), an American academic journal
 Logos Machine Translation System (now OpenLogos)

See also

 
 Logo (disambiguation)